Galambu (also known as Galambi, Galambe, Galembi) is an Afro-Asiatic language spoken in Nigeria.  Most members of the ethnic group do not speak Galambu.

Notes 

West Chadic languages
Languages of Nigeria